"Orion" is the seventh single by the band Girl Next Door and it was released on November 25, 2009. Orion was used as the theme song of Japanese ABC drama Untouchable.

CD track listing 
 Orion
 
 Drive Away (Gogo's Remix)
 Orion (Instrumental)

DVD track listing 
 Orion (Music Video: Monochrome Version)

Charts

Oricon Sales Chart

Billboard Japan

External links 
 Official website 

2009 singles
Girl Next Door (band) songs
Japanese television drama theme songs
2009 songs
Song recordings produced by Max Matsuura
Avex Trax singles